Wayne Patrick Dwyer is a New Zealand former rugby league footballer who represented New Zealand.

Early life
Dwyer was originally from the West Coast. He was educated at Marist Brothers High School, Greymouth.

Playing career
A Marist representative, Dwyer first represented the West Coast in 1978.

During the 1980s Dwyer represented both the West Coast and the South Island. He was included in the New Zealand national rugby league team squad in 1982 but did not play a Test match for New Zealand.

He retired in 1998, with his last match being the West Coast Rugby League grand final.

References

Living people
New Zealand rugby league players
New Zealand national rugby league team players
West Coast rugby league team players
South Island rugby league team players
Rugby league second-rows
Marist (West Coast) players
Year of birth missing (living people)
People educated at John Paul II High School, Greymouth